Geoplana is a genus of land planarians from South America.

Taxonomic history 
The genus Geoplana was erected in 1857 by William Stimpson and included most land planarians with several eyes distributed along the body. Species with only two eyes were placed in the genus Rhynchodemus, while species with a crescent-shaped head were placed in Bipalium.

In the same year, apparently unaware of Stimpson's paper, the naturalist Max Schultze, based on published information and new species collected in Brazil by the naturalist Fritz Müller, also erected a genus named Geoplana, but included all land planarians in it. However, Stimpson's system prevailed.

During most of the 20th century, many new land planarian species, mostly from Australia and South America, were placed in Geoplana. In 1955, Eudóxia Maria Froehlich defined that Geoplana vaginuloides would be the type-species of Geoplana, as it was the first species listed by Stimpson.

In 1990, Robert E. Ogren and Masaharu Kawakatsu published a review of the classification of land planarians and divided Geoplana in four genera: Geoplana, Gigantea, Notogynaphallia and Pasipha. Geoplana retained all species with dorsal testes, a protrusible penis and a female canal entering the genital antrum dorsally. Species with ventral testes, without a protrusible penis or with a female canal entering the genital antrum ventrally were placed in other genera.

During the 21st century, molecular studies revealed that Geoplana sensu Ogren & Kawakatsu was still heterogeneous. A study published in 2013 by Carbayo et al., based on molecular data, divided Geoplana in 6 genera: Geoplana, Barreirana, Cratera, Matuxia, Obama, and Paraba. Only three species remained as Geoplana, along with several incertae sedis.

Current description 
Currently, the genus Geoplana is characterized by having the features described by Ogren & Kawatasu (dorsal testes, a protrusible penis and a female canal entering the genital antrum dorsally) plus several others, such as a slender body with nearly parallel margins, a strongly convex dorsum, monolobulated eyes (i.e., simple and circular, with only one lobe), and a strong muscle tube around the intestine.

Species 
There are currently only thirteen species certainly belonging to Geoplana:

Geoplana apua Almeida & Carbayo, 2018
Geoplana boraceia Almeida & Carbayo, 2018
Geoplana cambara Almeida & Carbayo, 2018
Geoplana cananeia Almeida & Carbayo, 2018
Geoplana caraguatatuba Almeida & Carbayo, 2018
Geoplana chita Froehlich, 1956
Geoplana ibiuna Almeida & Carbayo, 2018
Geoplana iporanga Almeida & Carbayo, 2018
Geoplana mogi  Almeida & Carbayo, 2018
Geoplana paranapiacaba Almeida & Carbayo, 2018
Geoplana piratininga Almeida & Carbayo, 2018
Geoplana pulchella  Schultze & Müller, 1857
Geoplana vaginuloides (Darwin, 1844)

Also, there are several species currently considered incertae sedis:

Geoplana alterfusca  Hyman, 1962
Geoplana aymara  du Bois-Reymond Marcus, 1951
Geoplana beckeri  Froehlich, 1959
Geoplana bimbergi  Fuhrmann, 1914
Geoplana caleta  E. M. Froehlich 1978
Geoplana caucaensis  Fuhrmann, 1914
Geoplana caya  du Bois-Reymond Marcus, 1951
Geoplana chalona  du Bois-Reymond Marcus, 1951
Geoplana chanca  E. M. Froehlich, 1978
Geoplana chilihua  du Bois-Reymond Marcus, 1951
Geoplana chiuna  E. M. Froehlich, 1955b
Geoplana chulpa  du Bois-Reymond Marcus, 1951
Geoplana crawfordi  de Beauchamp, 1939
Geoplana excellentissima  Negrete, Brusa & Damborenea, 2012
Geoplana fragai  Froehlich, 1955b
Geoplana fuhrmanni  Hyman, 1962
Geoplana gabriellae  du Bois-Reymond Marcus, 1951
Geoplana goetschi  Riester, 1938
Geoplana guacensis  Fuhrmann, 1914
Geoplana irua  Fuhrmann, 1914
Geoplana jandira  Froehlich, 1955c
Geoplana lama  du Bois-Reymond Marcus, 1957
Geoplana lambaya  du Bois-Reymond Marcus, 1958
Geoplana lareta  du Bois-Reymond Marcus, 1958
Geoplana mayori  Fuhrmann, 1914
Geoplana mirim  E. M. Froehlich, 1972
Geoplana mixopulla  Ogren & Kawakatsu, 1990
Geoplana multipunctata  Fuhrmann, 1914
Geoplana pavani  Marcus, 1951
Geoplana pichuna  du Bois-Reymond Marcus, 1951
Geoplana picta  Froehlich, 1956a
Geoplana placilla  E. M. Froehlich, 1978
Geoplana quagga  Marcus, 1951
Geoplana quenua  du Bois-Reymond Marcus, 1958
Geoplana quichua  Marcus, 1951
Geoplana regia  E. M. Froehlich, 1955b
Geoplana saima  du Bois-Reymond Marcus, 1951
Geoplana shapra  du Bois-Reymond Marcus, 1957
Geoplana takia  du Bois-Reymond Marcus, 1951
Geoplana talpa  du Bois-Reymond Marcus, 1951
Geoplana tamboensis  Fuhrmann, 1914
Geoplana tirua  E. M. Froehlich, 1978
Geoplana toriba  Froehlich, 1958
Geoplana ubaquensis  Fuhrmann, 1914
Geoplana valdiviana  Grau & Carbayo, 2010
Geoplana vicuna  du Bois-Reymond Marcus, 1957

References 

Geoplanidae
Rhabditophora genera